Wheeler Oakman (born Vivian Eichelberger; February 21, 1890 – March 19, 1949) was an American film actor.

Early years
Oakman was born as Vivian Eichelberger in Washington, D.C., and educated in that city's schools. He grew up in Fairfax, Virginia, after moving there from Washington.

Career 

Before acting in films, Oakman was active in stock theater in the eastern United States.

Oakman appeared in over 280 films between 1912 and 1948. In silent films, he was often a leading man. Among his leading ladies were Priscilla Dean, Kathlyn Williams, Colleen Moore and Annette Kellerman. His most successful movie was Mickey, a 1918 comedy-drama, in which he played the love interest of Mabel Normand.

In 1928, he had a prominent role as the crime boss in the first all talking feature movie ever made, Lights of New York. Later in the sound era, his career declined, and he often portrayed villains or even henchman, frequently appearing in crime thrillers, melodramas and in Westerns.

In 1932, he appeared alongside Buck Jones in Sundown Rider and John Wayne in Texas Cyclone.

Later years 
Just prior to his death, Oakman was the assistant manager of a North Hollywood theater.

Personal life and death
In 1920, Oakman married popular actress Priscilla Dean, his costar in Outside the Law (1920) and The Virgin of Stamboul (1920). They were divorced in 1926. On September 22, 1927, he married Virginia Jennings in Los Angeles. On December 27, 1932, he married Frances I. Jones in Las Vegas, Nevada.

In 1949, at age 59, Oakman died in Van Nuys, California. He was interred at Pierce Brothers Valhalla Memorial Park in North Hollywood, California. There is no marker on his grave.

Selected filmography

Alas! Poor Yorick! (1913, Short) - Montgomery Irving - the Real Actor
The Spoilers (1914) - The Broncho Kid, alias of Drury
Shotgun Jones (1914, Short) - Shotgun Jones
Chip of the Flying U (1914, Short) - Weary
In the Days of the Thundering Herd (1914) - Chief Swift Wing
The Carpet from Bagdad (1915) - George P.A. Jones
The Melting Pot (1915) - Minor Role (uncredited)
The Rosary (1915) - Bruce Wilton
 Sweet Alyssum (1915) - Wynne Garlan
Hell's Hinges (1916) - Rowdy Townsman (uncredited)
The Ne'er-Do-Well (1916) - Kirk Anthony, the Ne're-Do-Well
The Cycle of Fate (1916) - Joe Strong
The Battle of Hearts (1916) - Jo Sprague
The Crisis (1916)
Betrayed (1917) - William Jerome
 Princess Virtue (1917) - Basil Demarest
Face Value (1917) - Bertram Van Twiller
I Love You (1918) - Armand de Gautier
Revenge (1918) - Dick Randall
The Claim (1918) - John MacDonald
Mickey (1918) - Herbert Thornhill
False Evidence (1919) - Burr Gordon
The Splendid Sin (1919) - Stephen Hartley
Back to God's Country (1919) - Peter Burke
A Woman of Pleasure (1919) - Bobby Ralston
Eve in Exile (1919) - Paul Armitage
The Virgin of Stamboul (1920) - Capt. Carlisle Pemberton
What Women Love (1920) - Willy St. John
Outside the Law (1920) - Dapper Bill Ballard
Peck's Bad Boy (1921) - Dr. Jack Martin - the Man in the Case
Penny of Top Hill Trail (1921) - Kurt Walters
A Wise Fool (1921) - (uncredited)
The Son of the Wolf (1922) - Scruff Mackenzie
 The Half Breed (1922) - Delmar Spavinaw (the halfbreed)
Slippy McGee (1923) - Slippy McGee
 Mine to Keep (1923) - Clint Mowbray
The Love Trap (1923)- Grant Garrison
 Other Men's Daughters (1923) - 'Winnie'
 Lilies of the Streets (1925) - Frank Delmore
The Pace That Thrills (1925) - Director
In Borrowed Plumes (1926) - Jack Raymond
Fangs of Justice (1926) - Paul Orr
Heroes of the Night (1927) - Jack Nichols
The Snarl of Hate (1927) - Boy Maxson
Hey! Hey! Cowboy (1927) - John Evans
Out All Night (1927) - Kerrigan
 Top Sergeant Mulligan (1928) - The captain
The Broken Mask (1928) - Dr. Gordon White
The Heart of Broadway (1928) - 'Dandy Jim' Doyle
 Danger Patrol (1928) - George Gambler
Black Feather (1928)
The Masked Angel (1928) - Luther Spence
Lights of New York (1928) - 'Hawk' Miller
The Good-Bye Kiss (1928) - Sgt. Hoffman
While the City Sleeps (1928) - Eddie 'Mile-Away' Skeeter Carlson
The Power of the Press (1928) - Van
What a Night! (1928) - Mike Corney
Morgan's Last Raid (1929) - John Bland
The Devil's Chaplain (1929) - Nicholay
The Shakedown (1929) - Manager
The Donovan Affair (1929) - Porter
Father and Son (1929) - Anton Lebau
On with the Show (1929) - Durant
 Handcuffed (1929) - Tom Bennett
Hurricane (1929) - First Mate (uncredited)
The Girl from Woolworth's (1929) - Lawrence Mayfield
Shanghai Lady (1929) - Repen
Little Johnny Jones (1929) - Wyman
The Show of Shows (1929) - Performer in 'The Pirate' Number (uncredited)
Roaring Ranch (1930) - Ramsey Kane
The Big Fight (1930) - Steve
The Bad Man (1930)
On Your Back (1930) - 'Lucky' Jim Seymour
The Costello Case (1930) - Mile-Away-Harry
The Lawless Woman (1931) - 'Poker' Wilson
Sky Raiders (1931) - Willard
The Good Bad Girl (1931) - Moreland
The Back Page (1931, Short)
First Aid (1931) - Michael Rush
Devil on Deck (1932) - Shanghai Morgan
Texas Cyclone (1932) - Utah Becker
The Airmail Mystery (1932, Serial) - Judson Ward
The Riding Tornado (1932) - Hatch Engall
Two-Fisted Law (1932) - Bob Russell
Beauty Parlor (1932) - Fremont
The Honor of the Press (1932) - Roger Bradley
The Boiling Point (1932) - Holt Norbo - Bank Cashier
Gorilla Ship (1932) - Philip Wells
The Western Code (1932) - Nick Grindell
The Heart Punch (1932) - Spike Patterson
Speed Demon (1932) - Pete Stenner
Guilty or Not Guilty (1932) - Joe
End of the Trail (1932) - Major Jenkins
Sundown Rider (1932) - Laughing Maxey
Man of Action (1933) - Sheriff Clem Norton
 Revenge at Monte Carlo (1933) - Spike Maguire
Silent Men (1933) - Ed Wilder
Soldiers of the Storm (1933) - George
Rusty Rides Alone (1933) - Poe Powers
Hold the Press (1933) - Hugh Abbott
Broadway Thru a Keyhole (1933) - Sam (uncredited)
Blood Money (1933) - Gangster with Shotgun (uncredited)
Palooka (1934) - Rafferty (uncredited)
 Paradise Valley (1934) - 'Smiley' Mason
The Lost Jungle (1934) - Kirby
 One Is Guilty (1934) - Toledo Eddie Marchetti
Operator 13 (1934) - Scout (uncredited)
In Old Santa Fe (1934) - Tracy
 Frontier Days (1934) - Henry Jethrow
Undercover Men (1934) - Insp. A.R. McCrae
Murder in the Clouds (1934) - Joe
Square Shooter (1935) - Jim Thorne
The Phantom Empire (1935) - Lord Argo
The Case of the Curious Bride (1935) - Detective Jones (uncredited)
G Men (1935) - Gangster at Lodge Wanting to Quit (uncredited)
The Headline Woman (1935) - Panther Fielding
Motive for Revenge (1935) - Doane
Code of the Mounted (1935) - Duval
Death from a Distance (1935) - Langsdale, aka George Fremont
Born to Gamble (1935) - Jeff Drugan (uncredited)
Trails of the Wild (1935) - Hardy
The Adventures of Rex and Rinty (1935) - Henchman Wheeler
The Man from Guntown (1935) - Henry DeLong
Annapolis Farewell (1935) - Cmdr. Lawson
Special Agent (1935) - Julie's Kidnapper (uncredited)
Timber War (1935) - Murdock
The Mysterious Avenger (1936) - Brophy
Roarin' Guns (1936) - Walton
Darkest Africa (1936, Serial) - Durkin
 Song of the Trail (1936) - Bob Arnold
Thoroughbred (1936) - Duke Foster
Aces and Eights (1936) - Ace Morgan
Kelly the Second (1936) - Bookie (uncredited)
Ghost Patrol (1936) - Kincaid
Gambling with Souls (1936) - 'Lucky' Wilder
Death in the Air (1936) - Lt. Douglas Thompson
Bank Alarm (1937) - Joe Karlotti
Slaves in Bondage (1937) - Jim Murray
Radio Patrol (1937, Serial) - Stevens
Land of Fighting Men (1938) - Wallace
Flash Gordon's Trip to Mars (1938, Serial) - Tarnak
Code of the Rangers (1938) - Blackie Miller
The Texans (1938) - Union Captain (uncredited)
Red Barry (1938, Serial) Weaver
In Old Montana (1939) - Jim Dawson
The Lone Ranger Rides Again (1939, Serial) - Manny - Fake Drunk (Ch. 9) (uncredited)
Buck Rogers (1939, Serial) - Lieutenant Patten
Wolf Call (1939) - Carson
Mutiny in the Big House (1939) - Prison Guard Benson
Torture Ship (1939) - John Ritter
Buried Alive (1939) - Manning
Power Dive (1941) - Sam - 1st Bartender (uncredited)
The Medico of Painted Springs (1941) - Fred Burns
Escort Girl (1941) - Gregory Stone
Double Trouble (1941) - Kimble
So's Your Aunt Emma (1942) - Blackie Hale, Henderson's Triggerman (uncredited)
Bowery at Midnight (1942) - Stratton
Fall In (1942) - Army Officer (uncredited)
The Adventures of Smilin' Jack (1943, Serial) - Freighter Mate [Chs. 7-8] (uncredited)
The Fighting Buckaroo (1943) - Sam Thatcher (uncredited)
Kid Dynamite (1943) - Tony - Bookie
The Ape Man (1943) - Police Detective Brady
Saddles and Sagebrush (1943) - Henchman Ace Barko
Ghosts on the Loose (1943) - Tony
Spotlight Scandals (1943) - Promoter
The Girl from Monterrey (1943) - Fight Announcer
Campus Rhythm (1943) - Sponsor (uncredited)
What a Man! (1944) - Tim - 1st Detective
Sundown Valley (1944) - Cab Baxter (uncredited)
Riding West (1944) - Captain Amos Karnes
Three of a Kind (1944) - Oliver
Bowery Champs (1944) - Tom Wilson
Mom and Dad (1945) - Bourbon Drinker on Train
Brenda Starr, Reporter (1945, Serial) - Joe Heller / Lew Heller (uncredited)
Rough Ridin' Justice (1945) - Virgil Trent (uncredited)
Trouble Chasers (1945) - Dek Sharp
Allotment Wives (1945) - Bartender (uncredited)
Who's Guilty? (1945, Serial) - Smiley
Hop Harrigan (1946, Serial) - Alex Ballard
In Fast Company (1946) - Cabbie-Henchman with graying mustache (uncredited)
Son of the Guardsman (1946, Serial) - Lord Markham (uncredited)
Jack Armstrong (1947, Serial) - Prof. Hobart Zorn
Brick Bradford (1947, Serial) - Louis Walthar
Superman (1948, Serial) - Dr. Fredrick Larkin (uncredited) (final film role)

References

External links
 

1890 births
1949 deaths
American male film actors
American male silent film actors
Male actors from Washington, D.C.
Burials at Valhalla Memorial Park Cemetery
Male Western (genre) film actors
20th-century American male actors